Olan Jermaine Williams V. State of Oregon was a court case in 2016. Olan Jermaine Williams, an African American male who holds a master's degree from Howard University and had no criminal record before this account, was accused of orally sodomizing an intoxicated Caucasian man following a party. The court ruled against the defendant (Williams) in a 10-2 non-unanimous verdict. Williams then requested a new trial with the claim that the 14th Amendment Equal Protection Clause was violated. Williams believed he was given an unfair trial due to his race seeing that there was only one African American person on the jury. The court denied Williams for a new trial. This case is important because of the controversy that arose following the verdict.

History 
Oregon is the only state within the United States that will convict a felony defendant with a non-unanimous verdict. This claims that the verdict only needs to be 10-2 on the jury to convict the defendant. While, in all of the other states within the United States the verdict must be unanimous to convict someone for a felony. Many claim that the decision to keep Oregon a non-unanimous court is to continue Oregon's long history with racism, specifically, Liza Kaplan, a professor at Lewis and Clark Law School in Portland has stated that this law was created for that exact reason.  The intent of this decision to make Oregon a non-unanimous court system was to keep the minorities's opinions on the jury silent. That is exactly what happened with this case. The one African American woman in this case believed Williams was innocent but her opinion ultimately did not matter because she was outvoted. She even explained that the majority of the time during discussion the other jurors were trying to convince her to change her vote (to vote against Williams).

Results 
On July 5th 2016 at the Multnomah courtroom in Portland Oregon Williams was declared guilty for two counts of first-degree sodomy. Williams filed an appeal for the case but the Oregon Court of Appeals denied his request. He is currently being held in an Oregon jail since the trial.

Similar cases 
 Apodaca v. Oregon
 Sabri v. United States 
 Mcdonald v. City of Chicago 
 Apprendi v. New Jersey 
 Blakely v. Washington

See also 

 Apodaca v. Oregon
 Hung jury

References

Legal history of Oregon
United States LGBT rights case law
2016 in LGBT history
LGBT history in Oregon